The Showdown is the third studio album by hard rock supergroup Allen-Lande, a collaboration between vocalists Russell Allen and Jørn Lande released on November 5, 2010. It is the third album in a row, and the last, to feature Magnus Karlsson as songwriter, producer and performer of most instruments, and Jaime Salazar on drums. Unlike on previous albums, Karlsson only wrote lyrics for a few songs, with most songs featuring lyrics by Tomas Erlandsson instead.

Track listing

Personnel
Musicians
Russell Allen - lead and backing vocals
Jørn Lande - lead and backing vocals
Magnus Karlsson - guitars, bass guitar, keyboards
Jaime Salazar - drums
Jesper Gustafsson - piano on tracks 6, 9 & 11

Production
Magnus Karlsson - production
Achim Koehler - mixing and mastering
Rodney Matthews - cover art

References

2010 albums
Allen-Lande albums
Frontiers Records albums
Albums with cover art by Rodney Matthews
Vocal duet albums